Um Crime no Parque Paulista is a 1921 Brazilian mystery film directed by Arturo Carrari and starring Nicola Tartaglione in his first role. It would also be the first film cinematographer José Carrari would work on beginning a decade long collaboration between the two until Arturo Carrari's final film Anchieta Entre o Amor e a Religião in 1932.

Further reading
Galvão, Maria Rita Eliezer. Cronica do Cinema Paulistano. São Paulo, Editora Atica, 1975. 
Plazaola, Luis Trelles. South American Cinema: Dictionary of Film Makers. San Juan: Editorial de la Universidad de Puerto Rico, 1989. 
Ramos, Fernão and Luiz Felipe Miranda. Enciclopédia do cinema Brasileiro. São Paulo: Editora Senac, 2000.

External links
 

1921 films
Brazilian black-and-white films
Brazilian mystery films
Brazilian silent films
Films directed by Arturo Carrari
1921 mystery films